The 2021–22 A-League Men, known as the Isuzu UTE A-League for sponsorship reasons, was the 45th season of national level men's soccer in Australia, and the 17th since the establishment of the competition as the A-League in 2004.

Melbourne City were the defending champions and premiers, having won their first titles respectively the previous season. They retained the premiership, but lost the Grand Final to first-time grand finalists Western United.

Clubs 
Twelve clubs participated in the 2021–22 season.

Personnel and kits

Managerial changes

Foreign players 

The following do not fill a Visa position:
1Those players who were born and started their professional career abroad but have since gained Australian citizenship (or New Zealand citizenship, in the case of Wellington Phoenix);
2Australian citizens (or New Zealand citizens, in the case of Wellington Phoenix) who have chosen to represent another national team;
3Injury replacement players, or National team replacement players;
4Guest players (eligible to play a maximum of fourteen games)

Salary cap exemptions and captains

Transfers

Regular season

League table

Fixtures and results

Finals series

Format
The finals series, which ran over three weeks, consisted of the top six teams from the regular season. In the first week of fixtures, the third-through-sixth ranked teams played a single-elimination match, with the two winners of those matches joining the first and second ranked teams in two-legged semi-final ties. The first and second placed teams chose whether they would play home or away in the first leg. The two winners of those matches meet in the Grand Final. This season was the first to use this format.

Elimination-finals

Semi-finals
Summary

|}

Matches

Western United won 4–2 on aggregate.

Melbourne City won 2–1 on aggregate.

Grand Final

Regular season statistics

Top scorers

Hat-tricks

Notes

(H) – Home team
(A) – Away team

Clean sheets

Awards

Annual awards
The following end of the season awards were announced at the 2021–22 Dolan Warren Awards night on 26 May 2022.

Team of the season

See also

 2021–22 A-League Women
 2021–22 Adelaide United FC season
 2021–22 Brisbane Roar FC season
 2021–22 Central Coast Mariners FC season
 2021–22 Macarthur FC season
 2021–22 Melbourne City FC season
 2021–22 Melbourne Victory FC season
 2021–22 Newcastle Jets FC season
 2021–22 Perth Glory FC season
 2021–22 Sydney FC season
 2021–22 Wellington Phoenix FC season
 2021–22 Western Sydney Wanderers FC season
 2021–22 Western United FC season

Notes

References

 
2021 in Australian soccer
2022 in Australian soccer
2021